Erynnis baptisiae, the wild indigo duskywing, is a species of butterfly of the  family Hesperiidae. It is found in North America from  southern Ontario and New England, west to central Nebraska, and south to Georgia, the Gulf Coast, and south-central Texas.

The species is rapidly expanding its range and abundance by colonizing plantings of crown vetch along roadways and railroad beds.

Erynnis lucilius, Erynnis baptisiae and Erynnis persius belong to the "Persius species complex", a confusing group of very similar species.

The wingspan is 35–41 mm. Adults are on wing from late April to early June and again from July to August. There are two generations per year.

The larvae mainly feed on Baptisia tinctoria, but have also been recorded on Baptisia australis, Lupinus perennis, Thermopsis villosa and Coronilla varia. Adults feed on nectar from flowers of blackberry, white sweet clover, dogbane, sunflower, crimson clover and probably others.

References

External links
Butterflies and Moths of North America
BugGuide

Erynnis
Butterflies described in 1936
Taxa named by William Trowbridge Merrifield Forbes